

Robert Fitz Richard (1064–1136) was an Anglo-Norman feudal baron of Little Dunmow, Essex and constable of Baynard's Castle in the City of London.  His feudal barony, the caput of which was at Little Dunmow in Essex, was granted to him by the king after it had been forfeited in 1110 by William Baynard, whose grandfather Ralph Baynard was the first holder and the builder of Baynard's Castle in the City of London.

Robert was steward under King Henry I (1100–1135) and  under King Stephen (1135–1154).

Family
Robert was the son of Sir Richard Fitz Gilbert, Lord of Clare and Tonbridge (c. 1030–1091) and Rohese Giffard, (b. c. 1034), daughter of Sir Walter Giffard, Lord of Longueville, and Agnes Flatel.

Robert married (c. 1114), Matilda de St. Liz (Maud), daughter of Sir Simon de St Liz, Earl of Northampton, and Maud de Huntingdon.

Children were:
Sir Walter Fitz Robert, (b. c. 1124), married Maud de Lucy. The Magna Carta surety, Robert Fitzwalter, was their son.
Maud Fitz Robert, (b. c. 1132), Essex, who married (c. 1146), William d'Aubigny, son of Sir William d'Aubigny, Lord of Belvoir, and Cecily Bigod. Another Magna Carta surety, William d'Aubigny, was their son.

Notes

Footnotes

Citations

References
 
 

FitzRichard, Robert
FitzRichard, Robert
FitzRichard, Robert
FitzRichard, Robert
FitzRichard, Robert
English landowners
De Clare family